Hatem McDadi (born 1960s) is a Canadian former professional tennis player.

Of Lebanese descent, the McDadi surname is the result of a translation attempt by a customs official when his father emigrated. He grew up in Mississauga and has an elder brother Sam who is a prominent real estate agent in Greater Toronto. Active on tour in the 1980s, McDadi had a best singles world ranking of 226 and ranked in the top 10 nationally. He is now the Senior Vice-president of High-Performance at Tennis Canada.

References

External links
 
 

1960s births
Living people
Canadian male tennis players
Canadian people of Lebanese descent
Racket sportspeople from Ontario
Sportspeople from Mississauga